
 
 

Little Desert is a locality in the Australian state of Victoria located about  north-west of the state capital of Melbourne and about  south of the municipal seat of Nhill. At the 2016 Census, Little Desert had a population of 5. The locality's name and extent was registered on 23 July 1998. The principal land use is conservation with the majority of the locality being occupied by the Little Desert National Park.

See also
Big Desert, Victoria

References

 

Towns in Victoria (Australia)